Henrique Almeida Caixeta Nascentes (born 27 May 1991), known as Henrique Almeida, is a Brazilian footballer who plays as a striker for América Mineiro.

Career
He arrived on the scene at the Tricolor Paulista in São Paulo Youth Championship 2009, where he was top scorer and best player in the club.  In February 2009, Henrique made his debut against Mogi Mirim, in the 2-0 loss, playing the last few minutes. It wasn't until a year later, in 2010, that he scored his first goal for São Paulo in the win over Gremio Barueri in the Paulista Championship.

In 2010, with first team opportunities hard to come by, he was loaned to Esporte Clube Vitória. He scored his first two goals for the red and black on August 15, 2010, in the 4-2 win over Santos. At the end of the season he returned to his parent club, following Esporte Clube Vitória's relegation to the Campeonato Brasileiro Série B.

On August 1, 2011 he scored the 200th goal in the history of the FIFA U-20 World Cup. On August 17, 2011, he scored two vital goals during the closing minutes of the Brazil-Mexico U-20 World Cup Semi-Final match, guiding his team into the Final. His stellar performances in the tournament would be recognised by him winning the FIFA U-20 World Cup Golden Ball and FIFA U-20 World Cup Golden Shoe awards, for highest scorer and most valuable player.

On January 17, 2012, it was announced São Paulo had agreed a fee to sell Henrique to English club QPR, subject to a work permit. However, on January 23, 2012, news broke of the collapse of the deal due to the work permit not being granted to the player. Although the deal seemed like it had fallen through, São Paulo vice-president Joao Lopez claimed "It was said that he was denied [a transfer] but this is not true, the FA would only authorise the deal if it was permanent." He went on to say, "the FA did not agree with the deal that was going on, so we will now meet again [with QPR] and try to come to an agreement." It now remains to be seen whether QPR will make a permanent bid for Henrique, who is valued around £6 million.

At the end of January 2012, shortly before the end of the winter transfer window, Henrique and his club agreed a deal with Spanish Liga BBVA side Granada CF. The terms of the deal were a €500,000 fee for a loan contract until June 2013, with Granada retaining an option to buy the player for €6,000,000 at any time.

On January 2, 2013, Henrique had 50% of his rights bought for Botafogo, and will play for Fogão until 2016.

On February 3, 2016, Henrique joined Grêmio on a four-year contract.

Honours
Botafogo
Campeonato Carioca: 2013

Grêmio
Copa do Brasil: 2016
Brazil U20
South American Youth Championship: 2011
FIFA U-20 World Cup: 2011
Individual
FIFA U-20 World Cup Golden Ball: 2011
FIFA U-20 World Cup Golden Shoe: 2011

References

External links

1991 births
Living people
Footballers from Brasília
Brazilian footballers
Association football forwards
Campeonato Brasileiro Série A players
Campeonato Brasileiro Série B players
São Paulo FC players
Esporte Clube Vitória players
Sport Club do Recife players
Botafogo de Futebol e Regatas players
Esporte Clube Bahia players
Coritiba Foot Ball Club players
Grêmio Foot-Ball Porto Alegrense players
Associação Chapecoense de Futebol players
América Futebol Clube (MG) players
Goiás Esporte Clube players
La Liga players
Granada CF footballers
Giresunspor footballers
TFF First League players
Belenenses SAD players
Primeira Liga players
Footballers at the 2011 Pan American Games
Brazil youth international footballers
Brazil under-20 international footballers
Brazilian expatriate footballers
Brazilian expatriate sportspeople in Spain
Expatriate footballers in Spain
Brazilian expatriate sportspeople in Turkey
Expatriate footballers in Turkey
Pan American Games competitors for Brazil